Johannes Strasser (born 6 July 1982) is a German basketball head coach who last coached the German team, RheinStars Köln Cologne of the 1. Regionalliga

Playing career
In his last career game, Strasser recorded 2 points in a 74–94 loss to the Ratiopharm Ulm.

Coaching career 
Strasser, after playing for 16 years for different teams, have decided to take the opportunity of coaching a basketball team. He was then selected as the head coach of RheinStars Köln Cologne and immediately made an impact to the franchise. He led the team to a first place and won the division champion. Afterwards, in 2016, he was transferred to become the coordinator of school instructors within Cologne, thus leaving the team. Then he came back in 2019, and again leading his team to a division champion.

References

External links
Johannes Strasser Player profile
Johannes Strasser Coaching Profile

1982 births
Living people
Artland Dragons players
Dragons Rhöndorf players
German basketball coaches
German men's basketball players
Guards (basketball)
Köln 99ers players
People from Dachau (district)
Sportspeople from Upper Bavaria
RheinStars Köln coaches
Telekom Baskets Bonn players